The 21st parallel north is a circle of latitude that is 21 degrees north of the Earth's equatorial plane. It crosses Africa, Asia, the Indian Ocean, the Pacific Ocean, North America, the Caribbean and the Atlantic Ocean.

At this latitude the sun is visible for 13 hours, 25 minutes during the summer solstice and 10 hours, 51 minutes during the winter solstice.

Around the world
Starting at the Prime Meridian and heading eastwards, the parallel 21° north passes through:

{| class="wikitable plainrowheaders"
! scope="col" width="125" | Co-ordinates
! scope="col" | Country, territory or sea
! scope="col" | Notes
|-
| 
! scope="row" | 
|
|-
| 
! scope="row" | 
|
|-
| 
! scope="row" | 
|
|-
| 
! scope="row" | 
|
|-
| 
! scope="row" | 
|
|-
| 
! scope="row" | 
|
|-
| style="background:#b0e0e6;" | 
! scope="row" style="background:#b0e0e6;" | Indian Ocean

| style="background:#b0e0e6;" | Red Sea
|-
| 
! scope="row" | 
|
|-
| 
! scope="row" | 
|
|-
| style="background:#b0e0e6;" | 
! scope="row" style="background:#b0e0e6;" | Indian Ocean
| style="background:#b0e0e6;" | Arabian Sea
|-
| 
! scope="row" | 
| Gujarat - Kathiawar peninsula
|-
| style="background:#b0e0e6;" | 
! scope="row" style="background:#b0e0e6;" | Indian Ocean
| style="background:#b0e0e6;" | Gulf of Khambhat
|-valign="top"
| 
! scope="row" | 
| Gujarat Maharashtra Chhattisgarh Orissa
|-
| style="background:#b0e0e6;" | 
! scope="row" style="background:#b0e0e6;" | Indian Ocean
| style="background:#b0e0e6;" | Bay of Bengal
|-
| 
! scope="row" | 
|
|-
| 
! scope="row" |  (Burma)
|
|-
| 
! scope="row" | 
|
|-
| 
! scope="row" | 
| Mainland and some islands; passing through Hanoi
|-valign="top"
| style="background:#b0e0e6;" | 
! scope="row" style="background:#b0e0e6;" | Pacific Ocean
| style="background:#b0e0e6;" | Gulf of Tonkin - passing just south of Weizhou Island, Guangxi, 
|-
| 
! scope="row" | 
| Guangdong (Leizhou Peninsula and Donghai Island)
|-
| style="background:#b0e0e6;" | 
! scope="row" style="background:#b0e0e6;" | South China Sea
| style="background:#b0e0e6;" | Passing just south of Mavudis island, 
|-valign="top"
| style="background:#b0e0e6;" | 
! scope="row" style="background:#b0e0e6;" | Pacific Ocean
| style="background:#b0e0e6;" | Passing between Molokai and Lanai islands, Hawaii, 
|-
| 
! scope="row" | 
| Island of Maui, Hawaii
|-
| style="background:#b0e0e6;" | 
! scope="row" style="background:#b0e0e6;" | Pacific Ocean
| style="background:#b0e0e6;" |
|-
| 
! scope="row" | 
| passing just south of León, Guanajuato
|-
| style="background:#b0e0e6;" | 
! scope="row" style="background:#b0e0e6;" | Gulf of Mexico
| style="background:#b0e0e6;" | Bay of Campeche
|-
| 
! scope="row" | 
| Yucatán Peninsula - passing through Mérida
|-
| style="background:#b0e0e6;" | 
! scope="row" style="background:#b0e0e6;" | Caribbean Sea
| style="background:#b0e0e6;" |
|-
| 
! scope="row" | 
| Doce Leguas Cays
|-
| style="background:#b0e0e6;" | 
! scope="row" style="background:#b0e0e6;" | Caribbean Sea
| style="background:#b0e0e6;" |
|-
| 
! scope="row" | 
|
|-
| style="background:#b0e0e6;" | 
! scope="row" style="background:#b0e0e6;" | Atlantic Ocean
| style="background:#b0e0e6;" |
|-
| 
! scope="row" | 
| Great Inagua island
|-
| style="background:#b0e0e6;" | 
! scope="row" style="background:#b0e0e6;" | Atlantic Ocean
| style="background:#b0e0e6;" | Passing to the south of the southernmost cays of the 
|-
| 
! scope="row" | Western Sahara
| Claimed by  - Ras Nouadhibou peninsula
|-
| 
! scope="row" | 
| Ras Nouadhibou peninsula
|-
| style="background:#b0e0e6;" | 
! scope="row" style="background:#b0e0e6;" | Atlantic Ocean
| style="background:#b0e0e6;" |
|-
| 
! scope="row" | 
|
|-
| 
! scope="row" | 
|
|}

See also
20th parallel north
22nd parallel north

References

n21